Jashwant Gangani is an Indian film writer director and producer.

Career
Jashwant Gangani is from Talaja taluka in Bhavnagar district, Gujarat, India. He moved to Surat in 1973 to find job. Initially he wrote short stories which progressed into writing scripts for films and editing. In 1989, he started directing and producing Gujarati films under his production house. Gangani Film Production Pvt. Ltd. His first Gujarati film as writer, lyricist, producer and director, Man Sayba Ni Mediye (1999) was commercially successful. He produced several commercially successful films targeted at rural audience; Maiyar Ma Mandu Nathi Lagtu (2001), Mandavda Ropavo Mana Raj (2003), Mein to Palavade Bandhi Preet (2005), Maiyar Ma Mandu Nathi Lagtu Part II (2008), Mara Rudiye Rangana Tame Saajana (2010). He directed and produced Hindi film Bezubaan Ishq (2015).

He also wrote, directed and produced Gujarati TV series, Kariyaawar, telecast on Zee Gujarati from 2006 to 2007 which completed 270 episodes.

Filmography

films

Television

External links

References

Gujarati-language film directors
Film directors from Gujarat
Indian male screenwriters
Living people
Hindi-language film directors
Film producers from Gujarat
People from Surat
People from Bhavnagar district
Year of birth missing (living people)